Russia competed at the 2019 Winter Deaflympics held between 12 and 21 December 2019 in Province of Sondrio in Northern Italy. Russian competitors won medals in each of the sports contested at the games and the country finished in 1st place in the medal table.

Medalists

Alpine skiing 

Elena Yakovishina won the gold medal in the women's downhill event and in the women's alpine combined event. Yakovishina also won the silver medal in the women's giant slalom event. She also won the gold medals in the women's slalom and the women's Super-G events.

Pavel Kazakov finished in 2nd place in the men's downhill event.

Chess 

Yulia Turkeeva won the gold medal in the women's blitz tournament and Olga Gerasimova won the bronze medal in that event.

Cross-country skiing 

In total cross-country skiers representing Russia won six gold medals, six silver medals and five bronze medals and the country finished in 1st place in the cross-country skiing medal table.

Lyubov Misharina won the gold medal in the women's sprint classic event. Anna Fedulova and Tatyana Gorbunova, also representing Russia, finished in 2nd and 3rd place in that event.

Vladimir Mayorov won the gold medal in the men's sprint classic event and Andrey Dubovskikh won the bronze medal in that event.

Anna Fedulova won the gold medal in the women's 5 km free technique event and Lyubov Misharina won the silver medal in that event.

In the men's 10 km free technique event Vladimir Mayorov and Maksim Kovalev finished in 2nd and 3rd place respectively.

Curling 

Russia won the silver medal in both the men's and women's curling tournaments.

Ice hockey 

Russia competed in the ice hockey tournament and won the bronze medal.

Snowboarding 

Russia won most of the medals in the snowboarding competition. In total snowboarders representing Russia won seven gold medals, six silver medals and six bronze medals.

In each of the snowboarding events at least one medal was won by a Russian competitor. Additionally, in two events, the men's parallel giant slalom and men's slalom, all medals were won by Russian competitors.

References 

Winter Deaflympics
Nations at the 2019 Winter Deaflympics